Anna Dange was an Indian politician and member of the Nationalist Congress Party. Dange was member of the Bharatiya Janata Party and also minister of Rural Development, Water supply, Retired Servicemen welfare in Manohar Joshi's ministry from 1995 to 1999 as well as minister in Narayan Rane's ministry

He quit the Bharatiya Janata Party in 2002 after he was repeatedly sidelined and ill treated by his fellow party members. He floated his new party called Lokrajya Party in 2006

In 2006, he joined Nationalist Congress Party and was named Vice-President of the Maharashtra State NCP in June 2011.

References 

People from Maharashtra
Bharatiya Janata Party politicians from Maharashtra
Nationalist Congress Party politicians from Maharashtra
Members of the Maharashtra Legislative Council
Living people
21st-century Indian politicians
Maharashtra politicians
Year of birth missing (living people)